Celeste Andrea Carnevale (born ) is an Argentine artistic gymnast, representing her nation at international competitions.

She participated at the 2004 Summer Olympics.

References

External links
https://www.youtube.com/watch?v=aFLPmMX3enY
Celeste Carnevale at Sports Reference
http://espndeportes.espn.com/nota?id=254655

http://jacksonville.com/tu-online/stories/081504/spo_16366973.shtml#.WJjgTFXyvIU

1985 births
Living people
Argentine female artistic gymnasts
Place of birth missing (living people)
Gymnasts at the 2004 Summer Olympics
Olympic gymnasts of Argentina
Gymnasts at the 2003 Pan American Games
Gymnasts at the 2007 Pan American Games
South American Games silver medalists for Argentina
South American Games bronze medalists for Argentina
South American Games medalists in gymnastics
Competitors at the 2002 South American Games
Pan American Games competitors for Argentina
21st-century Argentine women